Sergio Manuel Gutiérrez  (born 28 May 1989) is a Colombian football goalkeeper, who currently plays for Millonarios in the Copa Mustang. Gutiérrez is a product of the Millonarios youth system and played with the Millonarios first team since January 2008.

References

1989 births
Living people
Footballers from Bogotá
Association football goalkeepers
Colombian footballers
Millonarios F.C. players